Cyperus correllii is a species of sedge that is native to parts of the Bahamas.

See also
List of Cyperus species

References

correllii
Plants described in 1984
Flora of the Bahamas